Antigonus is a genus of skippers in the family Hesperiidae.

Species
Recognised species in the genus Antigonus include:
 Antigonus emorsa Felder, 1869
 Antigonus erosus Hübner, [1812]
 Antigonus nearchus Latreille, [1817]

References

Natural History Museum Lepidoptera genus database

Pyrgini
Hesperiidae genera
Taxa named by Jacob Hübner